Thomas E. George is a former American politician.

George attended O'Fallon Technical High School in O'Fallon, Missouri, and Washington University in St. Louis. Outside of politics, George worked as an electrician affiliated with the International Brotherhood of Electrical Workers from 1965 to his retirement in 2017. He was president of IBEW Local 1 from 1998 until his retirement.

He served in the Missouri House of Representatives from 1999 to 2006, as a Democratic legislator from house district 74.

References

Year of birth missing (living people)
Living people
Washington University in St. Louis alumni
People from Florissant, Missouri
American electricians
American trade union leaders
Democratic Party members of the Missouri House of Representatives
20th-century American politicians
21st-century American politicians